Jones, originally Jones Switch, is an unincorporated community in Autauga County, Alabama, United States.  The name was officially shortened on May 1, 1903.  The community has a post office, with postmasters appointed from 1878 to 2006.  The post office also serves unincorporated areas of Autauga County such as Vine Hill, Fremont, Bethel, Salem, Milton, and Fig Tree.

Geography
Mulberry Creek is located to the west and rolling hills are located to the east.

References

Unincorporated communities in Alabama
Unincorporated communities in Autauga County, Alabama